Kushkuh (also Romanized as Kūshkūh; also known as Kūshkūh-e Bālā) is a village in Rahimabad Rural District, Rahimabad District, Rudsar County, Gilan Province, Iran. At the 2006 census, its population was 716, in 187 families.

References 

Populated places in Rudsar County